The Manghen Pass is a  mountain pass in Trentino in Italy.

It connects the Fiemme valley and Valsugana, linking Molina and Castelnuovo in the south. The pass road has a maximum grade of 16%. Commercial traffic is prohibited.

The massive road climb from Val Sugana was featured in the 2008 and 2019 Giro d'Italia cycle race.

See also
 List of highest paved roads in Europe
 List of mountain passes

Manghen
Fiemme Mountains